David Justin Vincent (born April 22, 1965), also known as Evil D, is an American musician who is best known as the former lead vocalist and bassist for the death metal band Morbid Angel as well as the bassist for Genitorturers. His early influences include  Kiss, Alice Cooper, Black Flag, Slayer, Venom, Voivod and Black Sabbath Vincent typically plays bass with a pick, though he occasionally uses his fingers.

He left Morbid Angel in 1996 to join his then-wife's industrial metal band Genitorturers. Vincent's first contribution to the band was backing vocals on the song, "House of Shame", from their major label debut 120 Days of Genitorture. Vincent rejoined Morbid Angel in 2004, and resigned in 2015. He currently performs in I Am Morbid, featuring former drummer Tim Yeung and guitarist Bill Hudson, The Head Cat and death metal supergroup VLTIMAS, alongside Flo Mounier of Cryptopsy and Rune "Blasphemer" Eriksen, formerly of Mayhem (both musicians also collaborated with Steve Tucker before, David Vincent's predecessor and successor in Morbid Angel).

Vincent also played bass on the album World Downfall by the influential grindcore band Terrorizer, with Pete Sandoval (also of Morbid Angel) and Jesse Pintado.

Vincent contributed lead vocals on the opening song, "Blood Fire War Hate", on Soulfly's 2008 album Conquer. In 2015, he collaborated with Mexican metal band Nuclear Chaos, providing lead vocals and appearing in the music video of their single "Suffocate". As of 2016, Vincent has also been performing outlaw country music and released a single, "Drinkin' With The Devil" which he performed live at SXSW in March 2017 in Austin, Texas.

Vincent relocated from Tampa, Florida, in June 2014 to Austin, Texas, where he resides with his wife, Suzanne Penley.

Vincent's biography, I Am Morbid: Ten Lessons Learned from Extreme Metal, Outlaw Country, and the Power of Self-Determination, written with Joel McIver, was published by Jawbone Press in February 2020. The foreword to the book was written by astronomer Matt Taylor.

Discography

Morbid Angel 
 Altars of Madness (1989)
 Blessed are the Sick (1991)
 Covenant (1993)
 Covenant: Laibach Remixes (1994)
 Domination (1995)
 Entangled in Chaos (1996)
 Illud Divinum Insanus (2011)
 Illud Divinum Insanus: The Remixes (2012)

Genitorturers 
 Sin City (1998)
 Machine Love (2000)
 Flesh is the Law (2002)
 Blackheart Revolution (2009)

Terrorizer 
 World Downfall (1989)
 Hordes of Zombies (2012)

Vltimas 
Something Wicked Marches In (2019)

Collaborations 
 Karl Sanders - Saurian Meditation - Narration on "The Forbidden Path Across the Chasm of Self Realization" (2004)
 Soulfly – Conquer – Vocals on "Blood Fire War Hate" (2008)
 Nuclear Chaos – Ruins of the Future – Vocals on "Suffocate" (2015)

References

External links 
 

1965 births
Living people
American male singers
American heavy metal singers
American heavy metal bass guitarists
American male bass guitarists
Place of birth missing (living people)
Morbid Angel members
Musicians from Charlotte, North Carolina
American LaVeyan Satanists
Critics of religions
American male guitarists
20th-century American guitarists
Death metal musicians
Genitorturers members
Terrorizer members
The Head Cat members
American autobiographers